James Thornton (born 31 October 1975) is an English actor and voice-over artist. He is best known for portraying John Barton on the long-running British soap opera Emmerdale from 2009 to 2012; he previously appeared in the show in 1995.

Personal life
Thornton married the actress Joanna Page in December 2003. They have four children.

Four years before their marriage, they both appeared in the BBC adaptation of the Charles Dickens novel David Copperfield; he as Ham Peggotty, she as Dora Spenlow.

On 13 February 2010 Thornton was hit by a motorist in London and received medical treatment for leg injuries. Emmerdale producers rewrote scenes involving Thornton's character.

Selected filmography 
1995: Emmerdale
1998: Among Giants
1999: The Lakes
1999: David Copperfield
2000: Playing the Field
2001, 2003–2004: Red Cap
2003: Between the Sheets
2005: No Angels 
2006: Dalziel and Pascoe  "A Death in the Family" as Hugh Shadwell
2007: Holby City - Series 9
2008: HolbyBlue
2009–2012: Emmerdale
2014: Stella

Other credits 
Thornton has narrated several documentaries including Take Me to the Edge (2008) and The Curse of Oak Island for UK audiences. He appeared as himself in television shows including  Loose Women (2009–2012), and Let's Dance for Sports Relief (2011). He has narrated and appeared in the documentary, Benefits By the Sea : Jaywick (2015–2016) and also narrated the documentary series "The Motorway" shown on Channel 5 in the UK.

Awards and nominations

References

External links
.

1975 births
Living people
Male actors from Bradford
English male television actors
English male film actors
20th-century English male actors
21st-century English male actors